The Greatest Event in Television History is a mockumentary TV special series created by Adam Scott and Naomi Scott. The series premiered on Cartoon Network's late night programming block Adult Swim on October 12, 2012 and ended on January 23, 2014 with a total of four episodes. Each episode originally aired independently as a "special presentation", several months apart.

Format
The format of each special is a brief mockumentary about the shot-for-shot remake of a 1980s TV series opening credits sequence, followed by the remake itself. Series co-creator Adam Scott says the specials are at least in part motivated by his own memories of watching 1980s TV as a kid. Each episode is hosted by Jeff Probst with actors portraying fictional versions of themselves or others. After each episode, the original opening credit scene is shown.

Production
Four episodes were produced during the show's run; the series finale aired on January 23, 2014. In an interview with Splitsider, Scott explained the conclusion of the series: "It's a lot of work for such a short, stupid thing... they're really fun and they're fun to make, but we're ready to move on."

Cast
Amanda Anka as voiceover (voice)
Jeff Probst as himself
Jon Hamm as Rick Simon
Adam Scott as A.J. Simon / Jonathan Hart / Monroe Ficus / Henry Desmond
Paul Rudd as Director / Kip Wilson
Gus Van Sant as himself
Joe Schroeder as Tallest Doctor
Kathryn Hahn as Gretta Strauss / Sara Rush
Paul Scheer as Protester
Megan Mullally as Cecilia Simon
Bailey as Marlowe
Amy Poehler as Jennifer Hart
Paul Rust as Director
Horatio Sanz as Max
Maya Ferrara as Basecamp PA
David Wain as Bell Taint
Nick Kroll as Jeremy Bay
Catherine O'Hara as Muriel Rush
Jon Glaser as Henry Rush
Chelsea Peretti as Jackie Rush
Jason Mantzoukas as Director
Seth Morris as Channon Flowers
Damian Lang as Emergency Medic
Gillian Jacobs as Sonny Lumet
Mo Collins as Ruth Dunbar
Aisha Muharrar as Isabelle Hammond
Helen Slayton-Hughes as Lilly Sinclair
Aidy Bryant as Amy Cassidy

Episodes

References

External links
 
 

2012 American television series debuts
2014 American television series endings
Adult Swim pilots and specials
Film and television opening sequences
2010s American mockumentary television series
Adult Swim original programming
Television series by Williams Street